Cornelian Bay may refer to:

 Cornelian Bay, North Yorkshire, near Scarborough, North Yorkshire, England

 Cornelian Bay, Tasmania, a suburb of Hobart, Tasmania, Australia

 Cornelian Bay, former name of Carnelian Bay, California, United States